Straight Ahead! is an album by jazz pianist Junior Mance, recorded in 1964 and released on the Capitol label.

Reception

The Allmusic reviewer Dave Nathan stated: "Combining Mance's natural blues-inflected piano with a big horn sound is a true aural treat. The result is a musical conversation with each side taking turns playing on or over the melody line. ... Usually a large-ensemble format doesn't allow for much diversion from the charts. Here it's clear that the band stayed with the charts, but Mance was allowed a good deal of leeway in his playing. He could respond to the call of the band as he saw fit. The result is a dynamic session combining the best of a disciplined brass assembly with the unfettered play of a top jazz improvisor".

Track listing
 "In a Mellow Tone" (Duke Ellington, Milt Gabler) - 2:28
 "Hannah Strikes Again" (Hank Lentz) -1:45
 "Li'l Darlin'" (Neal Hefti) - 4:52
 "Diane" (Lew Pollack, Ernö Rapée) - 2:43
 "Happy Time" (Junior Mance) - 2:35
 "The Late, Late Show" (Roy Alfred, Murray Berlin) - 2:07
 "Fine Brown Frame" (Guadalupe Cartiero, J. Mayo Williams) - 2:08
 "Señor Mance" (Mance, Bob Bain) - 2:11
 "Stompin' at the Savoy" (Benny Goodman, Chick Webb, Edgar Sampson, Andy Razaf) - 2:57
 "Trouble in Mind" (Richard M. Jones) - 2:18
 "The J. A. M. F." (Lentz) - 2:10

Personnel
Junior Mance - piano
John Audino, Pete Candoli, Don Fagerquist, Al Porcino, Ray Triscari - trumpet
Milt Bernhart, Vern Friley, Lew McCreary - trombone
George Roberts, Ken Shroyer - bass trombone
Bob Bain - guitar, musical director
Monty Budwig - bass
Shelly Manne - drums
Bob Bain, David Cavanaugh - arranger

References

 

1964 albums
Junior Mance albums
Capitol Records albums
Albums produced by Dave Cavanaugh

Albums recorded at Capitol Studios